Cod is the common name for the demersal fish genus Gadus, belonging to the family Gadidae. Cod is also used as part of the common name for a number of other fish species, and one species that belongs to genus Gadus is commonly not called cod (Alaska pollock, Gadus chalcogrammus).

The two most common species of cod are the Atlantic cod (Gadus morhua), which lives in the colder waters and deeper sea regions throughout the North Atlantic, and the Pacific cod (Gadus macrocephalus), found in both eastern and western regions of the northern Pacific. Gadus morhua was named by Linnaeus in 1758. (However, G. morhua callarias, a low-salinity, nonmigratory race restricted to parts of the Baltic, was originally described as Gadus callarias by Linnaeus.)

Cod is popular as a food with a mild flavour and a dense, flaky, white flesh. Cod livers are processed to make cod liver oil, a common source of vitamin A, vitamin D, vitamin E, and omega-3 fatty acids (EPA and DHA). Young Atlantic cod or haddock prepared in strips for cooking is called scrod. In the United Kingdom, Atlantic cod is one of the most common ingredients in fish and chips, along with haddock and plaice.

Species
At various times in the past, taxonomists included many species in  the genus Gadus. Most of these are now either classified in other genera, or have been recognized as forms of one of three species. All these species have a number of common names, most of them ending with the word "cod", whereas other species, as closely related, have other common names (such as pollock and haddock).  However, many other, unrelated species also have common names ending with cod. The usage often changes with different localities and at different times.

Cod in the genus Gadus
Three species in the genus Gadus are currently called cod:

The fourth species of genus Gadus, Gadus chalcogrammus, is commonly called Alaska pollock or walleye pollock. But there are also less widespread alternative trade names highlighting the fish's belonging to the cod genus, like snow cod or bigeye cod.

Related species
Cod forms part of the common name of many other fish no longer classified in the genus Gadus. Many are members of the family Gadidae; others are members of three related families within the order Gadiformes whose names include the word "cod": the morid cods, Moridae (100 or so species); the eel cods, Muraenolepididae (four species); and the Eucla cod, Euclichthyidae (one species). The tadpole cod family (Ranicipitidae) has now been placed in Gadidae.

Some fish have common names derived from "cod", such as codling, codlet, or tomcod. ("Codling" is also used as a name for a young cod.)

Other species
Some fish commonly known as cod are unrelated to Gadus. Part of this name confusion is market-driven. Severely shrunken Atlantic cod stocks have led to the marketing of cod replacements using culinary names of the form "x cod", according to culinary rather than phyletic similarity. The common names for the following species have become well established; note that all inhabit the Southern Hemisphere.

Perciformes 
Fish of the order Perciformes that are commonly called "cod" include:
Blue cod Parapercis colias
Eastern freshwater cod Maccullochella ikei
Mary River cod Maccullochella peelii mariensis
Murray cod Maccullochella peelii peelii
Potato cod Epinephelus tukula
Sleepy cod Oxyeleotris lineolatus
Trout cod Maccullochella macquariensis
The notothen family, Nototheniidae, including:
Antarctic cod Dissostichus mawsoni
Black cod Notothenia microlepidota
Maori cod Paranotothenia magellanica

Rock cod, reef cod, and coral cod 
Almost all coral cod, reef cod or rock cod are also in order Perciformes. Most are better known as groupers, and belong to the family Serranidae. Others belong to the Nototheniidae. Two exceptions are the Australasian red rock cod, which belongs to a different order (see below), and the fish known simply as the rock cod and as soft cod in New Zealand, Lotella rhacina, which as noted above actually is related to the true cod (it is a morid cod).

Scorpaeniformes 
From the order Scorpaeniformes:
Ling cod Ophiodon elongatus
Red rock cod Scorpaena papillosa
Rock cod Sebastes

Ophidiiformes 
The tadpole cod family, Ranicipitidae, and the Eucla cod family, Euclichthyidae, were formerly classified in the order Ophidiiformes, but are now grouped with the Gadiformes.

Marketed as cod
Some fish that do not have "cod" in their names are sometimes sold as cod. Haddock and whiting belong to the same family, the Gadidae, as cod.
 Haddock Melanogrammus aeglefinus
 Whiting Merlangius merlangus
 Patagonian toothfish or Chilean seabass

Characteristics

Cods of the genus Gadus have three rounded dorsal and two anal fins. The pelvic fins are small, with the first ray extended, and are set under the gill cover (i.e. the throat region), in front of the pectoral fins. The upper jaw extends over the lower jaw, which has a well-developed chin barbel. The eyes are medium-sized, approximately the same as the length of the chin barbel. Cod have a distinct white lateral line running from the gill slit above the pectoral fin, to the base of the caudal or tail fin. The back tends to be a greenish to sandy brown, and shows extensive mottling, especially towards the lighter sides and white belly. Dark brown colouration of the back and sides is not uncommon, especially for individuals that have resided in rocky inshore regions.

The Atlantic cod can change colour at certain water depths. It has two distinct colour phases: gray-green and reddish brown. Pacific cod are smaller than Atlantic cod and are darker in colour.

Distribution
Atlantic cod (Gadus morhua) live in the colder waters and deeper sea regions throughout the North Atlantic. Pacific cod (Gadus macrocephalus) is found in both eastern and western regions of the Pacific.

Atlantic cod could be further divided into several stocks, including the Arcto-Norwegian, North Sea, Baltic Sea, Faroe, Iceland, East Greenland, West Greenland, Newfoundland, and Labrador stocks. For instance, eastern Baltic cod shows specific reproductive adaptations to low salinity compared to Western Baltic and Atlantic cod.

Off the Norwegian and New England coasts and on the Grand Banks of Newfoundland, cod congregate at certain seasons in water of  depth. Cod are gregarious and form schools, although shoaling tends to be a feature of the spawning season.

Life cycle
Around the UK, the major spawning grounds are in the middle to southern North Sea, the start of the Bristol Channel (north of Newquay), the Irish Channel (both east and west of the Isle of Man), around Stornoway, and east of Helmsdale.

Prespawning courtship involves fin displays and male grunting, which leads to pairing. The male inverts himself beneath the female, and the pair swim in circles while spawning. The eggs are planktonic and hatch between eight and 23 days, with larva reaching  in length. The young cod then move to the seabed and change their diet to small benthic crustaceans, such as isopods and small crabs. Growth tends to be less at higher latitudes. Changes in growth rate over decades of particular stocks have been reported, current eastern Baltic cod shows the lowest growth observed since 1955.

Ecology

Adult cod are active hunters, feeding on sand eels, whiting, haddock, small cod, squid, crabs, lobsters, mussels, worms, mackerel, and molluscs.

In the Baltic Sea the most important prey species are herring and sprat. Many studies that analyze the stomach contents of these fish indicate that cod is the top predator, preying on the herring and sprat. Sprat form particularly high concentrations in the Bornholm Basin in the southern Baltic Sea. Although cod feed primarily on adult sprat, sprat tend to prey on the cod eggs and larvae.

Cod and related species are plagued by parasites. For example, the cod worm, Lernaeocera branchialis, starts life as a copepod-like larva, a small free-swimming crustacean. The first host used by the larva is a flatfish or lumpsucker, which it captures with grasping hooks at the front of its body. It penetrates the fish with a thin filament, which it uses to suck the fish's blood. The nourished larvae then mate on the fish. The female larva, with her now fertilized eggs, then finds a cod, or a cod-like fish such as a haddock or whiting. There the larva clings to the gills while it metamorphoses into a plump sinusoidal wormlike body with a coiled mass of egg strings at the rear. The front part of the worm's body penetrates the body of the cod until it enters the rear bulb of the host's heart. There, firmly rooted in the cod's circulatory system, the front part of the parasite develops like the branches of a tree, reaching into the main artery. In this way, the worm extracts nutrients from the cod's blood, remaining safely tucked beneath the cod's gill cover until it releases a new generation of offspring into the water.

Fisheries

The 2006 northwest Atlantic cod quota is 23,000 tons, representing half the available stocks, while the northeast Atlantic quota is 473,000 tons. Pacific cod is currently enjoying strong global demand. The 2006 total allowable catch (TAC) for the Gulf of Alaska and Aleutian Islands was 260,000 tons.

Aquaculture
Farming of Atlantic cod has received a significant amount of interest due to the overall trend of increasing cod prices alongside reduced wild catches.  However, progress in creating large scale farming of cod has been slow, mainly due to bottlenecks in the larval production stage, where survival and growth are often unpredictable.  It has been suggested that this bottleneck may be overcome by ensuring cod larvae are fed diets with similar nutritional content as the copepods they feed on in the wild  Recent examples have shown that increasing dietary levels of minerals such as selenium, iodine and zinc may improve survival and/or biomarkers for health in aquaculture reared cod larvae.

As food

Cod is popular as a food with a mild flavor and a dense, flaky white flesh. Cod livers are processed to make cod liver oil, an important source of vitamin A, vitamin D, vitamin E and omega-3 fatty acids (EPA and DHA).

Young Atlantic cod or haddock prepared in strips for cooking is called scrod. In the United Kingdom, Atlantic cod is one of the most common ingredients in fish and chips, along with haddock and plaice. Cod's soft liver can be tinned (canned) and eaten.

History

Cod has been an important economic commodity in international markets since the Viking period (around 800 AD). Norwegians travelled with dried cod and soon a dried cod market developed in southern Europe. This market has lasted for more than 1,000 years, enduring the Black Death, wars and other crises, and is still an important Norwegian fish trade. The Portuguese began fishing cod in the 15th century. Clipfish is widely enjoyed in Portugal. The Basques played an important role in the cod trade, and allegedly found the Canadian fishing banks before Columbus' discovery of America. The North American east coast developed in part due to the vast cod stocks. Many cities in the New England area are located near cod fishing grounds. The fish was so important to the history and development of Massachusetts, the state's House of Representatives hung a wood carving of a codfish, known as the Sacred Cod of Massachusetts, in its chambers.

Apart from the long history, cod differ from most fish because the fishing grounds are far from population centers. The large cod fisheries along the coast of North Norway (and in particular close to the Lofoten islands) have been developed almost uniquely for export, depending on sea transport of stockfish over large distances. Since the introduction of salt, dried and salted cod (clipfish or 'klippfisk' in Norwegian) has also been exported. By the end of the 14th century, the Hanseatic League dominated trade operations and sea transport, with Bergen as the most important port.

William Pitt the Elder, criticizing the Treaty of Paris in Parliament, claimed cod was "British gold"; and that it was folly to restore Newfoundland fishing rights to the French.

In the 17th and 18th centuries in the New World, especially in Massachusetts and Newfoundland, cod became a major commodity, creating trade networks and cross-cultural exchanges. In 1733, Britain tried to gain control over trade between New England and the British Caribbean by imposing the Molasses Act, which they believed would eliminate the trade by making it unprofitable. The cod trade grew instead, because the "French were eager to work with the New Englanders in a lucrative contraband arrangement". In addition to increasing trade, the New England settlers organized into a "codfish aristocracy". The colonists rose up against Britain's "tariff on an import".

In the 20th century, Iceland re-emerged as a fishing power and entered the Cod Wars. In the late 20th and early 21st centuries, fishing off the European and American coasts severely depleted stocks and become a major political issue. The necessity of restricting catches to allow stocks to recover upset the fishing industry and politicians who are reluctant to hurt employment.

Collapse of the Atlantic northwest cod fishery

In 1992 the Canadian Federal Minister of Fisheries and Oceans, John Crosbie, declared a moratorium on the Northern Cod fishery, which for the preceding 500 years had largely shaped the lives and communities of Canada's eastern coast. Fishing societies interplay with the resources which they depend on: fisheries transform the ecosystem, which pushes the fishery and society to adapt. In the summer of 1992, when the Northern Cod biomass fell to 1% of earlier levels, Canada's federal government saw that this relationship had been pushed to the breaking point, and declared a moratorium, ending the region's 500-year run with the Northern Cod.

Observations on the reduced number and size of cod, and concerns of fishermen and marine biologists was offered, but generally ignored in favour of the uncertain science and harmful federal policies of Canada's Department of Fisheries and Oceans until the undeniable complete collapse of the fishery.  According to any reasonable analysis, the collapse was first due to massive overfishing. Second, the dependence for maintenance of the fishery itself on the nutrient cycle that was being disrupted by removal of megatons of biomass from a closed system resulted in the starvation of the residual fish.

See also
 Harold Innis and the cod fishery, for the Canadian industry

References

Further reading

 Bavington, Dean L.Y. Managed Annihilation: An Unnatural History of the Newfoundland Cod Collapse (University of British Columbia Press; 2010) 224 pages. Links the collapse of Newfoundland and Labrador cod fishing to state management of the resource.
 
 
 Mark Kurlansky (1997). Cod: A Biography of the Fish That Changed the World.

External links

Codtrace 
fishbase.org – Scientific Names for Gadus
Fisheries Heritage website, Newfoundland and Labrador
Long term trends in Norwegian cod fisheries – the pioneers
Species factsheet on cod from the UK Sea Fish Industry Authority (PDF, 2MB)

Commercial fish
Gadidae
Fish common names